A hielaman or hielamon is an Australian Aboriginal shield. Traditionally such a shield was made from bark or wood, but in some parts of Australia such as Queensland a hielaman is any  shield.

References
 Oxford Dictionary of English, 2nd Edition Revised
 Aboriginal Words in Australian English, Hiroyuki Yokose, 2001.

Shields
Australian Aboriginal bushcraft